Hedda Eulenberg (6 March 1876 – 13 September 1960) was a German translator and writer

Biography 
Eulenberg was born in Meiderich (today part of Duisburg) in Prussian Rhine Province, the daughter of Wilhelm Maase, a music director. She passed her school-leaving exam (Abitur) in 1893 at the Luisenschule in Düsseldorf. In 1897 she married the author Arthur Moeller van den Bruck in Berlin, whom she had known since her days at school in Düsseldorf. 1901 she met the writer Herbert Eulenberg in Berlin at the premiere of his play Muenchhausen. The same year Arthur Moeller van den Bruck fled to France for political and economical reasons.

In 1901 Max Bruns published her ten volumes of the translations of Edgar Allan Poe's works, followed by the translation of Jeanne Marni's novel La Femme de Silva (Die Gattin) issued by Julius Bard the next year. In 1903 Reclam published her German translation of Germinal by Émile Zola.

In 1904 Hedda divorced from Arthur Moeller van den Bruck and married Herbert Eulenberg. In 1905 they moved to Kaiserswerth near Düsseldorf, where Eulenberg worked as a dramaturge at the Schauspielhaus theatre under director Louise Dumont. At her new home she began her first translations of Guy de Maupassant, Charles Dickens and further works by Émile Zola. Until 1936 numerous German translations were published by Max Bruns, Reclam, Nymphenburger Verlag (Munich), and other publishing houses. At the same time she published numerous newspaper articles, mostly about Monism.

In 1936 the Nazi authorities started persecution of Hedda and Herbert Eulenberg to destroy their economical and intellectual existence. While several members of her family were arrested in concentration camps, Hedda could no longer find a German publisher who was prepared to publish her works.

After 1945 she began to pick up her work again, which she had to stop in 1936. In 1952 her autobiography Im Doppelglück von Kunst und Leben was published. In 1956 she returned to her translations of Henri Troyat, Yvette Guilbert, and Thomas Burke, all published by Heinrich Droste in Düsseldorf. On 13 September 1960 she died in Kaiserswerth in her Haus Freiheit ('House of Freedom') residence.

Literary works 
Im Doppelglück von Kunst und Leben. Düsseldorf: Die Faehre, [1952].
Abgesang. Düsseldorf: Die Faehre, [1952]

External links

 
 Haus Freiheit
 Google Books
 BAM Portal  Germany's common portal for libraries, archives and museums
 Bibliography

1876 births
1960 deaths
German translators
People from Duisburg
People from the Rhine Province
English–German translators
French–German translators